Georges Claude Clément was a French track and field athlete who competed at the 1900 Summer Olympics in Paris, France.

Clément competed in the 400 metres.  He placed fourth in his first-round (semifinals) heat and did not advance to the final.

References

External links

 De Wael, Herman. Herman's Full Olympians: "Athletics 1900". Accessed 18 March 2006.
 

Athletes (track and field) at the 1900 Summer Olympics
Olympic athletes of France
French male sprinters
Year of birth missing
Year of death missing
Place of birth missing
Place of death missing